The Battle of Cartagena occurred on May 13, 460 (or 461) and was part of the wars of Majorian. Although many sources call it battle of Cartagena, the battle did not take place at Cartagena but on the coast of Roman Carthaginensis province at Portus Ilicitanus (today Santa Pola) in the bay of Alicante. Since Portus Ilicitanus was the port of Elche (Ilici), the battle is sometimes referred as battle of Elche.

Background

In 457, the Roman general Majorian succeeded to the throne of the Western Roman Empire. He immediately set about restoring the empire to its former boundaries. Majorian then began to assemble a fleet at Portus Ilicitanus (near Ilici), with which he intended to invade the Vandal Kingdom in North Africa.

The battle 
By spring 460 (or 461), Majorian had 300 ships already built and he would have had another few more ready by the autumn. The Vandals decided to strike before the Roman navy became unbeatable. On May 13, a fleet of Vandal ships under the command of King Genseric surprised the Roman fleet. Many of the Roman captains had been bribed to switch sides. The Roman navy was totally destroyed, ending any hope of reconquering North Africa.

Sources

460
Cartagena
Cartagena
Cartagena
Cartagena
Cartagena
Cartagena
Vandal Kingdom